Science Hall may refer to:

Science Hall (Indianola, Iowa), listed on the National Register of Historic Places (NRHP)
Science Hall (Ada, Oklahoma), listed on the NRHP
Science Hall (Alva, Oklahoma), listed on the NRHP
University of Wisconsin Science Hall, Madison, Wisconsin, listed on the NRHP

Architectural disambiguation pages